The Christian Centuries was a BBC Radio Four series presented by Brian Redhead. The series traced developments over the course of centuries centring round certain charismatic personalities.

In an obituary note, written by Tam Dalyell for The Independent, Dalyell said that he had told Redhead he thought the radio series the best thing Redhead had done, and that he had agreed and wanted to pursue more such material.

A book of the series by Brian Redhead and Frances Gumley was published in 1989 by BBC Books. 

 Constantine the Great
 Jerome
 Leo I
 Benedict of Nursia
 Hilda of Whitby
 Charlemagne
 Kassia
 Vladimir, Prince of Kiev
 Pope Urban II
 Hildegard of Bingen
 Francis of Assisi
 Dante Alighieri

References 

Historical television series
Historiography of Christianity